The Browns Bridge is a cantilever bridge in Georgia (U.S. state) carrying Georgia State Route 369 (Browns Bridge Road) across the Chattahoochee River / Lake Sidney Lanier between Gainesville and Cumming. It is just 35 miles northeast of Atlanta. As of 2018, a new bridge is being built adjacent to and just South of the existing bridge.

Road bridges in Georgia (U.S. state)
Cantilever bridges in the United States
Buildings and structures in Forsyth County, Georgia
Buildings and structures in Hall County, Georgia